Lysander is a masculine given name. Of Greek origin, its meaning is "liberator". The name comprises the elements "lysis" (freedom) and "andros" (man).

Notable people with this name
Lysander, military general of ancient Sparta
Albert Lysander (1875–1956), Swedish Lutheran priest; one of the early pioneers of the Swedish High Church movement
Lysander Button (1810–1898), American inventor
Lysander Farrar (1812–1876), New York politician
Lysander Spooner (1808–1887), American political activist and legal theorist

Fictional characters
Lysander I and IV, monarchs in the fictional CoDominium universe
Lysander (Shakespeare), character in Shakespeare's A Midsummer Night's Dream
Lysander, a character in the video game Diablo II
Lysander, a Trojan warrior killed by Ajax the Great in Homer's Iliad
Lysander, a fictional game character in the game Amour sucr%C3%A9
Lysander au Lune, a character introduced in the second book of Pierce Brown's Red Rising series.

See also
 Lysander (disambiguation)

References